
Year 292 (CCXCII) was a leap year starting on Friday (link will display the full calendar) of the Julian calendar. At the time, it was known as the Year of the Consulship of Hannibalianus and Asclepiodotus (or, less frequently, year 1045 Ab urbe condita). The denomination 292 for this year has been used since the early medieval period, when the Anno Domini calendar era became the prevalent method in Europe for naming years.

Events 
 By place 
 Roman Empire 
 The jurist Gregorius, at the court of Emperor Diocletian, produces the Gregorian Code, the first codification of Roman law (approximate date).

 Asia 
 Bongsang becomes ruler of the Korean kingdom of Goguryeo.

 Mesoamerica 
 The oldest known Mayan stele is erected at the capital Tikal (modern Guatemala).

Births 
 He Chong (or Cidao), Chinese politician (d. 346)
 Pachomius, Christian theologian and writer (d. 348)
 Zhu Jingjian, Chinese Buddhist nun (d. 361)

Deaths 
 Yang Zhi, Chinese empress of the Jin Dynasty (b. 259)

References